102 Jamz may refer to:

 WJMH, a mainstream urban radio station licensed to Reidsville, North Carolina
 WQMP, a mainstream urban radio station licensed to Daytona Beach, Florida